Hypercompe burmeisteri is a moth of the family Erebidae first described by Walter Rothschild in 1910. It is found in Argentina.

References

Moths described in 1910
burmeisteri